The Farragut-class destroyer was a group of 10 guided-missile destroyers built for the United States Navy (USN) during the 1950s. They were the second destroyer class to be named for Admiral David Farragut. The class is sometimes referred to as the Coontz class, since Coontz was first to be designed and built as a guided-missile ship (under project SCB 142), whereas the previous three ships were designed as all-gun units (under SCB 129) and converted later. The class was originally envisioned as a Destroyer Leader class (DL/DLG, verbally referred to as "Frigates"), but was reclassified as Guided-Missile Destroyers following the 1975 ship reclassification.

Design and description
The Farragut class was the first class of missile-armed carrier escorts to be built as such for the USN. They displaced  at full load. Their crew consisted of 23 officers and 337 enlisted men.

The ships were equipped with two geared steam turbines, each driving one propeller shaft, using steam provided by 4 water-tube boilers.

The Farragut-class ships were armed with a 5"/54 caliber Mark 42 gun forward. They were fitted with an eight-round ASROC launcher between the 5-inch (127 mm) gun and the bridge. The Farragut (DDG-37) was the only ship of her class that had an ASROC magazine mounted behind the launcher. The class was already top-heavy and the addition of the magazine reportedly made it worse, so the decision was made not to equip the other nine ships with magazines. Close-range anti-submarine defense was provided by two triple  Mk 32 torpedo tubes. The primary armament of the Farraguts was the Terrier anti-aircraft missile designed to defend the carrier battle group. They were fired via the dual-arm Mark 10 launcher and the ships stowed a total of 40 missiles for the launcher.

Ships in class

Service
Originally commissioned as guided-missile frigates (DLG), they were redesignated as guided-missile destroyers (DDG) under the fleet realignment in 1975. They were also the only redesignated ships to be renumbered as well under the realignment, with the first unit changing from DLG-6 to DDG-37 and all subsequent vessels being renumbered upwards in order. During various refits all ships had their two 3" gun mounts removed and replaced by two quad Harpoon anti-ship missile launchers and their fire control and search radars upgraded to handle SM-2 ER missiles. All ships of the class were decommissioned between 1989 and 1994 and subsequently scrapped.

See also
 Farragut-class destroyer (1934)
 List of United States Navy destroyer leaders

Notes

References

External links
 
 Farragut-class frigates at Destroyer History Foundation

 
Destroyer classes